Alexander Evans may refer to:

 Alexander Evans (American politician) (1818–1888), U.S. Representative from Maryland
 Alexander Evans (Australian politician) (1881–1955), member of the Tasmanian Legislative Council
 Alexander Evans (diplomat), acting British High Commissioner to India
 Alexander William Evans (1868–1959), botanist, bryologist, and mycologist
 Alex Evans (cyclist) (1997-present), professional cyclist

See also
Alex Evans (disambiguation)